Late night television in the United States is the block of television programming intended for broadcast after 11:00 p.m. and usually through 2:00 a.m. Eastern and Pacific Time (ET/PT), but which informally can include programs aired as late as the designated overnight graveyard slot.

By definition, late night programming begins on the Big Three television networks (ABC, NBC and CBS) at or shortly before 11:35 p.m. ET/PT, after the conclusion of local late-evening newscasts on their owned-and-operated and affiliated stations; late night programming on other broadcast networks, including Fox and PBS, and cable television channels start at 11:00 p.m. ET/PT. Some streaming services (such as Netflix, Hulu and Amazon Prime Video) have ventured into the late-night talk format at various times in recent years, though these programs are in-format-only, given that episodes are often released before the start of the designated time period.

The following is a list of programs that are currently airing or have previously aired during the late night daypart on American television networks and streaming services.

Current

Past

Broadcast networks

ABC 
 The Les Crane Show (November 9, 1964 – February 25, 1965) – interview/tabloid talk format with audience questions
 ABC's Nightlife (March 1–November 12, 1965) – talk/variety series serving as a reformatting of The Les Crane Show; originally featured rotating hosts, before Crane returned as host in June 1965
 The Joey Bishop Show (April 17, 1967 – December 26, 1969)
 The Dick Cavett Show (December 29, 1969 – January 1, 1975)
  Wide World of Entertainment (January 8, 1973 – October 22, 1982, retitled ABC Late Night in January 1976) – originally a block of comedy/variety programs, talk shows hosted by Dick Cavett (The Dick Cavett Show) and Jack Paar (Jack Paar Tonite), concerts, documentaries and specials; reformatted as  ABC Late Night in 1976, featuring reruns of ABC prime time shows (such as Soap, The Love Boat and Starsky & Hutch)
 In Concert (November 24, 1972 – April 25, 1975) – aired Friday nights
 Good Night America (1973–1975) – hosted by Geraldo Rivera; aired as part of ABC's Wide World of Entertainment
 Fridays (April 11, 1980 – April 23, 1982) – sketch comedy series
 The Last Word (October 1982–April 1983) – hosted by Phil Donahue and Greg Jackson
 One on One (April–August 1983) – hosted by Greg Jackson
 Eye on Hollywood (August 1983–July 1986) – entertainment news/interview program
 Lifestyles of the Rich and Famous (July–September 1986) – aired simultaneously on ABC and in syndication
 The Dick Cavett Show (September 22–December 30, 1986) – aired Tuesdays and Wednesdays
 Jimmy Breslin's People (September 1986–January 1987) – aired Thursdays and Fridays
 Monday Sportsnite (June–August 1987) – sports discussion program; hosted by Al Trautwig; aired Monday nights
 Into the Night Starring Rick Dees (July 1990–July 1991)
 ABC In Concert (June 7, 1991 – September 11, 1998) – aired Friday nights
 ABC In Concert Country (June 4–August 10, 1994) – country music-focused spin-off; aired Saturday nights
 Politically Incorrect with Bill Maher (January 7, 1997 – July 15, 2002, moved from Comedy Central)
 Nightline Up Close (July 8, 2002 – January 24, 2003) – ABC News spin-off of Nightline, featuring one-on-one interviews conducted by Ted Koppel; temporary replacement for Politically Incorrect following cancellation due to Maher's comments about the perpetrators of the September 11 attacks
 The Alec Baldwin Show (March 4–December 29, 2018)

CBS 
 The Faye Emerson Show (October 24, 1949 — June 22, 1951) - 15 minute chat show, began as an east coast program but was on the full network, three nights a week by March 1950. Emerson also concurrently hosted a show on NBC for several months in 1950.
 The Merv Griffin Show (August 18, 1969 – February 11, 1972)
 The CBS Late Movie (February 14, 1972 – September 20, 1985) – originally formatted as a weeknight movie showcase; began incorporating reruns of CBS series as well as some first-run British imported series during the block's timeslot in 1977
 CBS News Nightwatch (October 3, 1982 – March 27, 1992) – overnight topical discussion program; hosted by Harold Dow, Christopher Glenn, Karen Stone, Felicia Jeter, Mary Jo West (1982–84) and Charlie Rose (1984–1990); various hosts were used from 1990–92
 CBS Late Night (September 23, 1985 – January 6, 1989, October 30, 1989 – March 29, 1991) – reformatting of The CBS Late Movie block featuring reruns of CBS series, imported and first-run programs; block was replaced by The Pat Sajak Show in January 1989, and returned following the reduction of Sajak to an hour-long format (from 90 minutes)
 Keep on Cruisin''' (January–June 1987) – weekly variety series produced by Dick Clark; hosted by Stephen Bishop and Sinbad; aired Fridays
 In Person from the Palace (June–August 1987) – weekly music series produced by Dick Clark, featuring taped concert performances from the Palace Theater in Hollywood; aired Fridays
 Top of the Pops (September 1987–March 1988) – music series based on the BBC pop music show; hosted by Nia Peeples; aired Fridays
 Overtime... with Pat O'Brien (August 1990) – interview program; canceled after three episodes
 The Midnight Hour (July–September 1990) – talk show featuring rotating hosts (including comedienne Joy Behar, CBS This Morning weather anchor/co-host Mark McEwen, actor Marc Price, and satirist Bill Maher)
 The Pat Sajak Show (January 9, 1989 – April 13, 1990)
 America Tonight (October 3, 1990 – March 28, 1991) – news and interview program produced by CBS News; hosted by Dan Rather, Charles Kuralt and Lesley Stahl
 America Tonight Friday (October 7, 1990 – March 29, 1991) – Friday edition hosted by Robert Krulwich and Edie Magnus
 Crimetime After Primetime (April 1, 1991 – January 5, 1995) – weeknight showcase of first-run and Canadian-imported crime dramas
 Personals (September 1991–December 1992) – dating game show in which a contestant would choose from three potential dates; the final round featured a series of yes or no questions for the winning couple, with a date destination that declined in quality each time their answers were incompatible (ranging from as high as an exotic location to as low as a trip to Pink's Hot Dogs' Los Angeles stand); hosted by Michael Burger
 Night Games (October 1991–June 1992) – dating show in which three men and three women are asked questions containing sexual innuendo, with the winning contestant choosing whom he or she would take on a date; hosted by Jeff Marder, with Luann Lee as his announcer/assistant
 Up to the Minute (March 30, 1992 – September 18, 2015) – overnight newscast
 The Kids in the Hall (September 18, 1992 – January 6, 1995, moved from HBO) – sketch comedy series; aired Fridays
 The Late Show (August 30, 1993–present)
 Late Show with David Letterman (August 30, 1993 – May 20, 2015)
 The Late Late Show (January 9, 1995–present)
 The Late Late Show with Tom Snyder (January 9, 1995 – March 26, 1999)
 The Late Late Show with Craig Kilborn (March 29, 1999 – August 27, 2004)
 The Late Late Show with Craig Ferguson (January 3, 2005 – December 19, 2014)
 The Talk After Dark (January 12–16, 2015) – nighttime edition of CBS daytime program; temporary replacement for the Late Late Show during transition from Craig Ferguson to James Corden.
 CBS Summer Showcase (May 21–September 7, 2015) – showcase of CBS drama reruns; temporary replacement for the Late Show during transition from David Letterman to Stephen Colbert as host

 NBC 
 The Faye Emerson Show (April 15, 1950 — May 20, 1950) -  15 minute talk show
 Broadway Open House (May 29, 1950 – August 24, 1951)
 Fifteen with Faye (June — August 1950) - 15 minute talk show
 Party Time at Club Roma (October 1950–January 1951)
 The Tonight Show (September 27, 1954–present)
 Tonight Starring Steve Allen (September 27, 1954 – January 25, 1957)
 Tonight! America After Dark (January 28–July 26, 1957)
 Tonight Starring Jack Paar (July 29, 1957 – March 30, 1962)
 The Tonight Show Starring Johnny Carson (October 1, 1962 – May 22, 1992)
 The Tonight Show with Jay Leno (May 25, 1992 – May 29, 2009; March 1, 2010 – February 6, 2014)
 The Tonight Show with Conan O'Brien (June 1, 2009 – January 22, 2010)
 The Tomorrow Show (October 15, 1973 – December 17, 1981, retitled Tomorrow Coast to Coast in September 1980) – hosted by Tom Snyder and co-hosted by Rona Barrett from October 1980 until mid-1981; aired Monday–Thursday nights following The Tonight Show, with reruns continuing following its cancellation until January 28, 1982
 The Midnight Special (February 2, 1973 – May 1, 1981) – music series; aired Friday nights
 Weekend (October 20, 1974–December 1978) – NBC News newsmagazine hosted by Lloyd Dobyns, and co-hosted in its final year by Linda Ellerbee; aired about one week per month in lieu of Saturday Night Live reruns, before being moved to prime time until it ended in April 1979
 SCTV Network 90 (May 1981–March 1983) – Canadian sketch comedy series; aired Friday nights
 Late Night (February 1, 1982–present)
 Late Night with David Letterman (February 1, 1982 – June 25, 1993)
 Late Night with Conan O'Brien (September 13, 1993 – February 20, 2009)
 Late Night with Jimmy Fallon (March 2, 2009 – February 7, 2014)
 NBC News Overnight (July 5, 1982 – December 3, 1983) – overnight news/discussion program; hosted by Lloyd Dobyns (later replaced by Bill Schechner) and Linda Ellerbee
 Friday Night Videos (July 29, 1983 – May 24, 2002, retitled Friday Night in 1994) – weekly series; originally formatted as a music video showcase, converted to a variety format in 1994
 Late Friday (January 5, 2001 – May 24, 2002) – reformat of Friday Night focused on stand-up comedy routines
 Saturday Night's Main Event (May 11, 1985 – April 27, 1991) – World Wrestling Federation (WWF, now WWE) wrestling showcase; aired occasionally as filler in place of Saturday Night Live reruns 
 Later (August 22, 1988 – January 18, 2001) – switched between one-on-one interview (1988–1994, 2000–2001) and conventional late-night talk/monologue formats (1994–2000) during its run; reruns of SCTV Network 90 aired under the Later banner for the latter's final year after its talk format was discontinued in January 2001
 NBC Nightside (November 4, 1991 – September 20, 1998) – overnight newscast
 Poker After Dark (January 1, 2007 – September 23, 2011) – poker tournament program
 The Jay Leno Show (September 14, 2009 – February 9, 2010)
 Last Call with Carson Daly (January 8, 2002 – May 24, 2019) – originally maintained conventional late-night talk/comedy format; switched to on-location, documentary-style interview format in 2009
 A Little Late with Lilly Singh (September 16, 2019 – June 3, 2021) - replaced Last Call with Carson Daly in the 1:37 a.m timeslot. Format was a mixture of interviews, comedy sketches, and commentary "rants"

 Fox 
 The Late Show (October 9, 1986 – October 28, 1988)
 The Late Show Starring Joan Rivers (October 9, 1986 – May 15, 1987)
 The Late Show (various hosts) (May 18–December 8, 1987; January 11–October 28, 1988)
 The Wilton North Report (December 11, 1987 – January 8, 1988)
 Comic Strip Live (August 12, 1989 – January 15, 1994) – weekly stand-up comedy series; depending on the media market, it aired on either Saturday or Sunday evening
 The Chevy Chase Show (September 7–October 1, 1993)
 Saturday Night's Main Event (February 8–November 14, 1992, moved from NBC) – weekly WWF wrestling showcase
 Mad TV (October 14, 1995 – May 16, 2009) – sketch comedy series; aired on Saturday nights
 Saturday Night Special (April 1–May 18, 1996) – sketch comedy/variety series; aired on Saturday nights; produced by Roseanne Barr
 Talkshow with Spike Feresten (September 16, 2006 – May 16, 2009) – aired on Saturday nights
 The Wanda Sykes Show (November 7, 2009 – April 24, 2010) – aired on Saturday nights
 Animation Domination High-Def (July 21, 2013 – March 5, 2016) – aired on Saturday nights
 Party Over Here (March 12–May 21, 2016) – sketch comedy series; aired on Saturday nights

 DuMont Television Network 
 Monodrama Theater (May 1952–December 7, 1953) – variety series, aired Monday–Friday at 11:00 p.m. ET, featuring an actress or actor performing plays solo in front of a curtain in a form of monodrama
 The Ernie Kovacs Show (April 12, 1954 – April 7, 1955) – the DuMont version of the program aired Monday–Friday 11:15 p.m. to 12:15 a.m. ET, ending as the network began winding down operations; Kovacs moved to NBC and hosted the Tonight Show on Mondays and Tuesdays for one season

 PBS 
 Soul! (September 12, 1968 – March 7, 1973)
 Charlie Rose (September 30, 1991 – November 17, 2017)
 Charlie Rose: The Week (July 19, 2013 – November 24, 2017)
 Tavis Smiley (January 5, 2004 – December 13, 2017)
 Amanpour on PBS (December 11, 2017 – September 7, 2018)
 Beyond 100 Days (January 2 – September 6, 2018)
 BBC World News on PBS (January 12 – September 7, 2018)

 Telemundo 
 A Oscuras Pero Encendidos (1995–2001) – hosted by Paul Bouche
 Mas Vale Tarde (November 2007–April 2008) – hosted by Alex Cambert

 Telefutura / UniMás 
 Noche de Perros (October 31, 2011 – April 20, 2012)

 United Network 
 The Las Vegas Show (May 1–June 5, 1967) – variety show starring Bill Dana

 Syndication 
This list does not include the numerous game shows aired during the mid-1980s that often received late-night clearances (such as the 1985 run of The Nighttime Price Is Right) but were not expressly intended for late night audiences, nor does it include talk shows meant for daytime broadcast that air in late night slots in many markets due to either low ratings in their original timeslot, a lack of an available prime daytime slot or as a secondary run.
 The Steve Allen Show (April 1968–November 1969) – a revival of Allen's original Tonight format; syndicated by Filmways
 Don Kirshner's Rock Concert (1973–1981)
 Mary Hartman, Mary Hartman (1975–1978)
 All That Glitters (1977–1978)
 Fernwood 2 Night/America 2-Night (1977–1978)
 The Love Experts (September 1978–September 1979) – hosted by Bill Cullen
 The Uncle Floyd Show (1980–1998) – hosted by Floyd Vivino
 The George Michael Sports Machine (1984–March 2007) – Sunday night sports highlight and interview show; hosted by sportscaster George Michael
 Almost Live! (1984–1999) – weekly series; was briefly syndicated in the early 1990s
 Nightlife (September 1986–June 1987) – hosted by David Brenner; distributed by King World
 Ask Dr Ruth (January 1987) – sex advice talk show; hosted by sex therapist Dr. Ruth Westheimer
 The Arsenio Hall Show (1989–1994, 2013–2014) – syndicated by Paramount Domestic Television (original run) and CBS Television Distribution (revival)
 The Byron Allen Show (1989–1992) – originally formatted as an hour-long weekly program, converted to a half-hour weeknight format in 1992
 The Howard Stern Show (July 1990–August 1992) – syndicated by All American Television
 My Talk Show (September 1990–March 1991) – syndicated by MCA Television
 The Party Machine with Nia Peeples (January–September 1991) – syndicated by Paramount Domestic Television
 The Ron Reagan Show (August 1991)
 The Dennis Miller Show (January–September 1992) – following its cancellation, new episodes aired until June 1992; syndicated by Tribune Entertainment
 The Whoopi Goldberg Show (1992–1993) – syndicated by Genesis Entertainment
 The Jon Stewart Show (1993–1995) – Season 1 originated on MTV; season 2 was syndicated by Paramount Domestic Television
 Last Call (1994–1995) – discussion show featuring five panelists (which included, among others, John Melendez and Brianne Leary), syndicated by MCA Television
 Lauren Hutton and... (September 1995–May 1996) – syndicated by Turner Original Productions
 Night Stand with Dick Dietrick (1995–1997) – syndicated by Worldvision Enterprises
 Kwik Witz (1996–1999)
 The Keenen Ivory Wayans Show (1997–1998) – syndicated by Buena Vista Television
 Vibe (1997–1998) – syndicated by Columbia TriStar Television
 The Michael Essany Show (1997–2004) – originally aired on public-access television, then expanded to include a cable telecast on E! for two seasons
 The Magic Hour (June 1998–September 1998) – syndicated by 20th Television
 Comics Unleashed with Byron Allen (2006–2007; reruns still airing on local stations 
 The Edge with Jake Sasseville (2008)
 Late Night Republic with Jake Sasseville (2009–2011)

 Metromedia 
 The Merv Griffin Show (February 14, 1972 – September 5, 1986) – King World assumed syndication rights in 1984, although the show continued to be carried on Metromedia-owned stations until shortly after the group's sale to Fox/News Corporation in 1986
 Thicke of the Night (September 5, 1983 – June 15, 1984) – hosted by Alan Thicke; aired on Metromedia-owned stations and syndicated by MGM/UA Television to other markets
 The Jerry Lewis Show (June 18–22, 1984) – aired as a one-week trial run following Thicke of the Nights cancellation

 Westinghouse Broadcasting (Group W) 
Programs syndicated by Group W Productions aired on Westinghouse-owned stations and were syndicated to other markets; merged with CBS in 1996 to become Eyemark Entertainment, and folded into King World in 2000 by CBS.
 PM East (with Mike Wallace and Joyce Davidson)/PM West (with Terrence O'Flaherty) (1961–1962)
 The Steve Allen Show (July 1962–October 1964) – a revival of Allen's original Tonight format; unofficially known as "The Steve Allen Westinghouse Show" or "The Steve Allen Playhouse" (in reference to the renamed theater that served as its taping location) to distinguish it from the prime time show of the same name
 That Regis Philbin Show! (1964–1965)
 The Merv Griffin Show (May 1965–August 15, 1969)
 The David Frost Show (1969–1972)
 The Howard Stern Radio Show (August 22, 1998 – May 19, 2001) – distributed by Group W successor Eyemark Entertainment

 Local television 
 Almost Live! (KING-TV/Seattle, 1984–1999) – weekly series; aired as a local program for most of its run
 Man of the People with Pat Tomasulo (WGN-TV/Chicago, January 2018–July 2019) – weekly seriesTalk Tonight (KTSF 26/San Francisco, February 13, 2006 – December 27, 2019) – weekly series

 Cable/satellite 
 AMC 
 Dietland (June–July 2018)
 Geeking Out (July–October 2016)
 Talking Bad (August–September 2013)

 Adult Swim 
 Hot Package (October 2013 – 2015)

 BET 
 The Mo'Nique Show (October 5, 2009 – August 16, 2011)
 The Rundown with Robin Thede (October 12, 2017 – April 19, 2018)

 Bravo 
 Kathy (April 2012–March 2013)

 CMT 
 The Josh Wolf Show (June–July 2015)

 Comedy Central 
 The Daily Show (July 22, 1996–present)
 The Daily Show with Craig Kilborn (July 22, 1996 – December 17, 1998)
 The Daily Show with Jon Stewart (January 11, 1999 – August 6, 2015)
 Politically Incorrect with Bill Maher (July 25, 1993 – November 5, 1996)
 The Chris Wylde Show Starring Chris Wylde (August–October 2001)
 Tough Crowd with Colin Quinn (December 2002–November 2004)
 Insomniac with Dave Attell (August 2001–November 2004)
 Too Late with Adam Carolla (August 2005–November 2005)
 Weekends at the D.L. (July 2005–January 2006)
 The Colbert Report (October 17, 2005 – December 18, 2014)
 Chocolate News (October–December 2008)
 The Jeff Dunham Show (October–December 2009)
 The Benson Interruption (November–December 2010)
 Sports Show with Norm Macdonald (April–June 2011)
 Gabriel Iglesias Presents Stand Up Revolution (October 2011–November 2014)
 The Jeselnik Offensive (February–August 2013)
 @midnight with Chris Hardwick (October 21, 2013 – August 4, 2017)
 Adam Devine's House Party (October 2013–May 2016)
 Comedy Underground with Dave Attell (April–May 2014)
 The Meltdown with Jonah and Kumail (July 2014–November 2016)
 The Nightly Show with Larry Wilmore (January 19, 2015 – August 18, 2016)
 Why? with Hannibal Buress (July–August 2015)
 Not Safe with Nikki Glaser (February–August 2016)
 The Gorburger Show (April–June 2017)
 The High Court with Doug Benson (February–March 2017)
 Problematic with Moshe Kasher (April–June 2017)
 The Opposition with Jordan Klepper (September 25, 2017 – June 28, 2018)

 E! The Howard Stern Interview (November 27, 1992 – 1993)Howard Stern (E! show) (June 18, 1994 – July 8, 2005)
 Chelsea Lately (July 16, 2007 – August 26, 2014)
 Hello Ross (September 2013–May 2014)
 The Grace Helbig Show (April–June 2015)
 We Have Issues (September–October 2015)

 Freeform 
 Truth & Iliza (May–June 2017)

 Fox News 
 Red Eye (February 6, 2007 – April 7, 2017)
 Gutfeld! (May 31, 2015 - Present)

 Foxnet 
 The Spud Goodman Show (1995–1998)

 Fuse 
 White Guy Talk Show (March–May 2015)

 FX Brand X with Russell Brand (June 28, 2012 – May 2, 2013)Totally Biased with W. Kamau Bell (August 2012–June 2013)

 FXX Totally Biased with W. Kamau Bell (September–November 2013; moved from FX)

 G4TechTV 
 Unscrewed with Martin Sargent (May–November 2004; carried over from TechTV)

 HBO 
 Def Comedy Jam (July 1, 1992 – May 2, 1997)
 Dennis Miller Live (April 22, 1994 – August 30, 2002)
 Mr. Show with Bob and David (November 3, 1995 – December 28, 1998)
 The Chris Rock Show (February 7, 1997 – November 25, 2000)
 Reverb (April 13, 1997 – November 28, 2001)
 Def Poetry Jam (December 14, 2001 – February 7, 2007)
 Da Ali G Show (February 21, 2003 – August 22, 2004)

 History 
 Join or Die with Craig Ferguson (February–June 2016)

 MSNBC 
 Up Late with Alec Baldwin (October–November 2013)

 MTV 
 The Jon Stewart Show (October 1993–June 1995)
 Oddville, MTV (June 1997 – 1999)
 The New Tom Green Show (June–September 2003)
 Nikki & Sara Live (January–October 2013)
 Middle of the Night Show (October–December 2015)

 Showtime 
 Inside Comedy (January 2012–June 2015)
 Desus & Mero (February 21, 2019 – June 23, 2022)

 Sundance TV The Writers' Room (July 2013–June 2014)

 TBS 
 Lopez Tonight (November 9, 2009 – August 12, 2011)
 Conan (November 8, 2010 – June 24, 2021)
 Deon Cole's Black Box (June 10–July 15, 2013)
 The Pete Holmes Show (October 28, 2013 – June 18, 2014)
 Full Frontal with Samantha Bee (February 8, 2016 – June 23, 2022)

 TechTV 
 Unscrewed with Martin Sargent (May 2003–May 2004)

 TLC 
 Fashionably Late with Stacy London (November–December 2007)
 Late Night Joy (November 2015)

 The Nashville Network 
 Nashville Now (1983–1993)
 Music City Tonight (1993–1996)

 TV Land 
 ALF's Hit Talk Show (July–December 2004)
 Throwing Shade (January–March 2017)

 TV One 
 Donnie After Dark (February–December 2016)

 TruTV 
 The Chris Gethard Show (June 22, 2011 – May 29, 2018)

 USA Network 
 USA Up All Night (January 1989–March 1998)

 VH1 
 Late World with Zach (March–May 2002)
 VH1 Live! (July–September 2016)

 Viceland 
 Desus & Mero (October 2016–June 2018)

 Streaming services 
 Amazon Video 
 The Goodnight Show with Michael Essany (August 4, 2017) – three episodes released

HBO Max
 The Not Too Late Show with Elmo (May 27, 2020 – December 30, 2021)

 Hulu 
 I Love You, America with Sarah Silverman (October 2017–November 2018)

 Netflix 
 Chelsea (May 11, 2016 – December 15, 2017)The Joel McHale Show with Joel McHale (February 18 – July 15, 2018)Norm Macdonald Has a Show (September 14, 2018)
 The Break with Michelle Wolf (May 27–July 29, 2018)
 Patriot Act with Hasan Minhaj (October 28, 2018 – June 28, 2020)

 Peacock 
 Wilmore'' (September 18, 2020 - December 4, 2020)

See also
List of American late night talk show hosts

Notes

References

Lists of American television series
American late-night television shows